An anginal equivalent is a symptom such as shortness of breath (dyspnea), diaphoresis (sweating), extreme fatigue, or pain at a site other than the chest, occurring in a patient at high cardiac risk. Anginal equivalents are considered to be symptoms of myocardial ischemia. Anginal equivalents are considered to have the same importance as angina pectoris in patients presenting with elevation of cardiac enzymes or certain EKG changes which are diagnostic of myocardial ischemia.

References

Symptoms and signs: Respiratory system
Medical terminology